The World Youth Chess Championship is a FIDE-organized worldwide chess competition for boys and girls under the age of 8, 10, 12, 14, 16 and 18. Twelve world champions are crowned every year. Since 2015, the event has been split into "World Cadets Chess Championship" (categories U8, U10 and U12) and "World Youth Chess Championship" (categories U14, U16 and U18).

Under-18 winners

Cadets and Under-16 winners

Unofficial U18 Cadets
{| class="sortable wikitable"
! Year !! Location !! Boys 
|-
| 1974 ||  || 
|-
| 1975 ||  || 
|-
| 1976 ||  || 
|-
|}

Official U17 Cadets
{| class="sortable wikitable"
! Year !! Location !! Boys 
|-
| 1977 ||  || 
|-
| 1978 ||  || 
|-
| 1979 ||  || 
|-
| 1980 ||  ||   
|}

Under-16
{| class="sortable wikitable"
! Year !! Location !! Boys !! Girls
|-
| 1981 || (†) ||   || 
|-
| 1982 ||  ||  || not held
|-
| 1983 ||  ||   || not held
|-
| 1984 ||  ||   || 
|-
| 1985 ||  ||  || 
|-
| 1986 ||  ||  || 
|-
| 1987 ||  ||  || 
|-
| 1988 ||  ||  || 
|-
| 1989 ||  ||  || 
|-
| 1990 ||  ||  || 
|-
| 1991 ||  ||  || 
|-
| 1992 ||  ||  || 
|-
| 1993 ||  ||  || 
|-
| 1994 ||  ||  || 
|-
| 1995 ||  ||  || 
|-
| 1996 ||  ||  || 
|-
| 1997 ||  ||  || 
|-
| 1998 ||  ||  ||  
|-
| 1999 ||  ||  || 
|-
| 2000 ||  ||  || 
|-
| 2001 ||  || || 
|- 
| 2002 ||  ||  || 
|-
| 2003 ||  ||  || 
|-
| 2004 ||  ||  || 
|- 
| 2005 ||  ||  || 
|-
| 2006 ||  ||  ||
|-
| 2007 ||  ||  ||  
|-
| 2008 ||  ||  ||  
|- 
| 2009 ||  ||  || 
|-
| 2010 ||  ||  || 
|-
| 2011 ||  ||   || 
|-
| 2012 ||  ||  || 
|-
| 2013 ||  ||   || 
|-
| 2014 ||  ||  || 
|-
| 2015 ||  ||   || 
|-
| 2016 ||  || || 
|-
| 2017 ||  || || 
|-
| 2018 ||  ||  || 
|-
| 2019 ||  ||  ||   
|-
| 2020
|Online
|
|
|-
| 2021
|Online
|
|
|-
| 2022 ||  ||  || 
|}
(†) The girls tournament was held separately, in Westergate, England.

Under-14 winners

World Infant Cup
{| class="sortable wikitable"
! Year !! Location !! Boys 
|-
| 1979 ||  ||  
|-
| 1980 ||  ||  
|-
| 1981 ||  ||  
|-
| 1984 ||  ||  
|}

Boys & Girls
{| class="sortable wikitable"
! Year !! Location !! Boys !! Girls
|-
| 1985 ||  ||  || 
|-
| 1986 ||  ||  || 
|-
| 1987 ||  ||  || 
|-
| 1988 ||  ||  || 
|-
| 1989 ||  ||  || 
|-
| 1990 ||  ||  || 
|-
| 1991 ||  ||  || 
|-
| 1992 ||  ||  || 
|-
| 1993 ||  ||  || 
|-
| 1994 ||  ||  || 
|-
| 1995 ||  ||  || 
|-
| 1996 ||  ||  || 
|-
| 1997 ||  ||  || 
|-
| 1998 ||  ||  ||  
|-
| 1999 ||  ||  || 
|-
| 2000 ||  ||  || 
|-
| 2001 ||  || || 
|- 
| 2002 ||  ||  || 
|-
| 2003 ||  ||  || 
|-
| 2004 ||  ||  || 
|- 
| 2005 ||  ||  || 
|-
| 2006 ||  ||   ||
|-
| 2007 ||  ||  ||  
|-
| 2008 ||  ||  ||  
|- 
| 2009 ||  ||  || 
|-
| 2010 ||  ||  || 
|-
| 2011 ||  ||   ||  
|-
| 2012 ||  ||  || 
|-
| 2013 ||  ||  || 
|-
| 2014 ||  ||  ||  
|-
| 2015 ||  ||    || 
|-
| 2016 ||  ||  ||
|-
| 2017 ||  || ||
|-
| 2018 ||  ||  || 
|-
| 2019 ||  ||  || 
|-
| 2020
|Online
|
|
|-
| 2021
|Online
|
|
|-
| 2022 ||  ||  || 
|}

Under-12 winners
{| class="sortable wikitable"
! Year !! Location !! Boys !! Girls
|-
| 1986 ||  ||  || 
|-
| 1987 ||  ||  || 
|-
| 1988 ||  ||  || 
|-
| 1989 ||  ||  || 
|-
| 1990 ||  ||  || 
|-
| 1991 ||  ||  || 
|-
| 1992 ||  ||  || 
|-
| 1993 ||  ||  || 
|-
| 1994 ||  ||  || 
|-
| 1995 ||  ||  || 
|-
| 1996 ||  ||  || 
|-
| 1997 ||  ||  || 
|-
| 1998 ||  ||  ||  
|-
| 1999 ||  ||  || 
|-
| 2000 ||  ||  || 
|-
| 2001 ||  || || 
|- 
| 2002 ||  ||  || 
|-
| 2003 ||  ||  || 
|-
| 2004 ||  ||  || 
|- 
| 2005 ||  ||  || 
|-
| 2006 ||  ||   ||
|-
| 2007 ||  ||  ||  
|-
| 2008 ||  ||  || 
|- 
| 2009 ||  ||  || 
|-
| 2010 ||  ||  || 
|-
| 2011 ||  ||   ||  
|-
| 2012 ||  ||  || 
|-
| 2013 ||  ||  || 
|-
| 2014 ||  ||  || 
|-
| 2015 ||  ||   || 
|-
| 2016 ||  ||   || 
|-
| 2017 ||  ||  || 
|-
| 2018 ||  || ||
|-
| 2019 ||  ||  || 
|-
| 2020
|Online
|
|
|-
| 2021
|Online
|
|
|-
| 2022 ||  ||  || 
|}

Under-10 winners
{| class="sortable wikitable"
! Year !! Location !! Boys !! Girls
|-
| 1986 ||  ||   || 
|-
| 1987 ||  ||  || 
|-
| 1988 ||  ||   
|| 
|-
| 1989 ||  ||  || 
|-
| 1990 ||  ||  || 
|-
| 1991 ||  ||  || 
|-
| 1992 ||  ||  || 
|-
| 1993 ||  ||  || 
|-
| 1994 ||  ||  || 
|-
| 1995 ||  ||  || 
|-
| 1996 ||  ||  || 
|-
| 1997 ||  ||  || 
|-
| 1998 ||  ||  ||  
|-
| 1999 ||  ||  || 
|-
| 2000 ||  ||  || 
|-
| 2001 ||  || || 
|- 
| 2002 ||  ||  || 
|-
| 2003 ||  ||  || 
|-
| 2004 ||  ||  || 
|- 
| 2005 ||  ||  || 
|-
| 2006 ||  ||   ||
|-
| 2007 ||  ||  ||  
|-
| 2008 ||  ||  ||  
|- 
| 2009 ||  ||  || 
|-
| 2010 ||  ||  || 
|-
| 2011 ||  ||   || 
|-
| 2012 ||  ||  || 
|-
| 2013 ||  ||  || 
|-
| 2014 ||  ||  || 
|-
| 2015 ||  ||   || 
|-
| 2016 ||  ||  || 
|-
| 2017 ||  ||  || 
|-
| 2018 ||  || || 
|-
| 2019 ||  ||   || 
|-
| 2020
|Online
|
|
|-
| 2021
|Online
|
|
|-
| 2022 ||  ||  || 
|}

Under-8 winners
{| class="sortable wikitable"
! Year !! Location !! Boys !! Girls
|-
|2006
|
|
|
|-
| 2007 ||  ||  ||  
|-
| 2008 ||  ||  ||  
|- 
| 2009 ||  ||  || 
|-
| 2010 ||  ||  || 
|-
| 2011 ||  ||  || 
|-
| 2012 ||  ||  || 
|-
| 2013 ||  ||   ||  
|-
| 2014 ||  || || 
|-
| 2015 ||  ||   || 
|-
| 2016 ||  ||    || 
|-
| 2017 ||  ||  || 
|-
| 2018 ||  ||  || 
|-
| 2019 ||  ||  || 
|-
| 2020
|Not held
|
|
|-
| 2021
|Not held
|
|
|-
| 2022 ||  ||  || 
|}

See also
 World Junior Chess Championship
 European Junior Chess Championship
 European Youth Chess Championship

Notes
The main source of reference is indicated beneath each year's entry.

Tournament history

The first predecessor of the youth championship was the Cadet Championship. It started off unofficially in 1974 in France for players under 18. The 1975 and 1976 editions were also for U18. The 1976 featured very young players such as Julian Hodgson (12+) but also players slightly older than 18, but younger than 19 such as Louis Roos. It was recognized in 1977 by FIDE as the World Championship for Cadets for players under 17 and attracted for example Garry Kasparov. In 1981 the age limit was reduced to under 16, applicable at the start of the year the championship is played in. It was also the year in which the first girls' championship for U16 was played.

In 1979, International Year of the Child, the first edition of the World Infant Cup was played for under 14. This cup had four editions, 1979, 1980, 1981 and 1984. In 1985 the U14 event was included in the first edition of the World Youth Chess Festival for Peace. Subsequently, the age categories U10, U12 and U18 were introduced. In 1987 the festival included the sections U10, U12, U14 and U18, while the U16 was held separately. In 1988, U16 was incorporated, but U18 was held separately. It was not until 1989 that the festival included all five age categories. Later, the U16 and U18 were sometimes played at separately from the U10, U12 and U14, as was the case in 1990, 1991, 1995 and 1997. In 1997 the name of tournament was changed to the World Youth Chess Championships. The under 8 category was first introduced in 2006.

1974 – Pont-Sainte-Maxence, France, 2–13 July – The first World Cadet Championship was an Under-18 event, organised by the French chess authorities. Thirty players took part in an 11-round Swiss. Englishman Jonathan Mestel won by a one-and-a-half point margin, scoring +8−0=3. The silver and bronze medals went to Evgeny Vladimirov and Oskar Orel, respectively. Also competing were the Canadian Jean Hébert and the Lebanese Bachar Kouatly.

 --- The Batsford Chess Yearbook, Kevin J O'Connell (ed.) (1975, Batsford) p. 128

1975 – Creil, France, 1–12 July – The second World Cadets was once again a French organised Under-18 event, comprising twenty-five players in an 11-round Swiss. David Goodman of England won the gold medal (8½/11), with silver going to Terence Wong of Singapore (8/11) and bronze to Predrag Nikolić of Yugoslavia (7/11). Also with 7 points was Australia's Ian Rogers, taking a share of third place. The West German Eric Lobron and Lebanese Bachar Kouatly were two future grandmasters who also took part.

 --- The Batsford Chess Yearbook 1975/76, Kevin J O'Connell (ed.) (1976, Batsford) p. 73

1978 – Sas-van-Gent, Netherlands, December 1978 – January 1979 – The World Cadets tournament was held over the New Year. Scotland gained its first ever world champion in chess, Paul Motwani from the city of Dundee. Following closely were England's Nigel Short, aged only 13, and Jose Huergo of Cuba, who required a tie-break to separate them. Other well known players in the pack included Ivan Morovic of Chile and Jóhann Hjartarson of Iceland.

 --- CHESS magazine Vol 44. March p. 191

1979 – Belfort, France – (July) – For a second successive year, England's Nigel Short (age 14) narrowly failed to take the World Cadets title, after losing out to his Argentine rival, Marcelo Tempone on the sum of opponent's scores rule (a method of tie-break). Third place was taken by Ivan Morovic and further down the field were future grandmasters Gilberto Milos, Joel Benjamin, Jan Ehlvest, Alon Greenfeld and Jóhann Hjartarson.

 --- CHESS magazine Vol 44. October p. 368

1980 – Le Havre, France – (? – ?) – The World Cadet Championship (for players under 17 on 1 September 1980) was played alongside the familiar Le Havre Open chess tournament. A total of fifty-one 'cadets' represented forty-nine different countries. France fielded three players, two by right and a third when immigration officials mysteriously refused entry to the Pakistan entrant. The winner, Valery Salov, displayed the usual Soviet formula of good preparation and technique, with strategically planned draws against his nearest rivals, Alon Greenfeld and Joel Benjamin. Greenfeld might have tied first, but lost his crucial last round game with Benjamin, despite having the white pieces. Some of the players and their seconds were unhappy about the conditions, particularly the dormitory-style accommodation and food quality. Many also felt that the Brazilian, Gilberto Milos, was unfairly treated when his twice adjourned game was concluded on the free day without prior warning. He was awoken at 9.10 am and told that his clock had been started. Understandably upset, he played and lost, his follow-up protest falling on deaf ears. The list of entries also contained future grandmasters Suat Atalık and Dibyendu Barua, among others.

 --- CHESS magazine Vol 45. Aug–Sept p. 237

1989 – Aguadilla, Puerto Rico – (28 July – 9 August) – There were 54 countries and 281 juniors participating. Living conditions were quite stretched as the organisers were not expecting the players to be accompanied by more than 200 adults. Regrettably, there was a shortage of competent decision-making organisers, but a friendly, good humoured atmosphere prevailed and the problems were resolved amicably. A variety of tie-breaking systems were used to separate the final places. In the case of the Boys Under-10 category, the resulting split was particularly harsh on the Brazilian Rafael Leitão, who was deprived of a gold medal on the basis of 'strength of first round opponent'. Antoaneta Stefanova, the winner of the girls Under-10 event, was already being talked about as a future women's world champion. IM Bob Wade attended the event and felt that the most successful countries were those that prepared their competitors best in terms of 'basic' rather than 'opening' training. Among the lesser medals were; Alex Sherzer (silver, U-18), Christopher Lutz (bronze, U-18), Matthew Sadler (silver, U-16), Vladimir Kramnik (silver, U-14), Peter Leko (bronze, U-10). In the girls events, Tea Lanchava took silver in the U-16 and Corina Peptan, bronze in the U-12.

 --- CHESS magazine Vol 54. November pp. 26–27

1990 – Fond du Lac, USA – (14–22 July) – Wisconsin's Marian College hosted the 5th World Youth Festival, which attracted 170 players from 44 nations. With federation officials and parental entourages, this number swelled to more than 300. It was the first time that the USA had hosted a chess event of this size and importance and the accommodation and conditions received high praise from the competitors. Judit Polgár celebrated victory on her fourteenth birthday (23 July), by taking the gold medal in the Boys U-14 event. This was the second occasion on which she had successfully competed in the Boys category. Her father, Laszlo Polgar, pointed out that Judit's last three 'world' competitions, including the Thessaloniki Olympiad, had resulted in a score of +26 =9 -0. Vasily Emelin of the USSR and Gabriel Schwartzman of Romania finished in silver and bronze medal places. Russia's Diana Darchia won the corresponding Girls' U-14 event from the USSR's Inna Gaponenko and Hungarian Monika Grabics. In the Boys U-12, Boris Avrukh outdistanced second placed John Viloria and third placed Peter Leko. Corina Peptan was triumphant in the Girls U-12, ahead of Monika Bobrowska and Nikoletta Lakos. In the Boys U-10, Nawrose Nur won by a good margin from the Romanian Alin Berescu and Adrien Leroy of France. Ecuador's Evelyn Moncayo took gold in the Girls U-10, while Claudia Bilciu of Romania and Jovanka Houska of England took silver and bronze, respectively. New In Chess Best Game awards were chaired by Arnold Denker and won by Judit Polgár, Yvonne Krawiec, Tal Shaked, Corina Peptan, Francisco Vallejo Pons and Claudia Bilciu. Polgar made it a clean sweep by winning an Under-14 Blitz tournament from Vasily Emelin and Ronan Har-Zvi of Israel.

 --- CHESS magazine Vol 55. October p. 5 and  November p. 26

1992 – Duisburg, Germany – (29 June – 13 July) – The venue, a large sports complex, was playing host to over 500 competitors engaged in 10 World Junior Championships. There were initially some problems with overcrowding, but these were quickly sorted out by the organisers. There was a commentary room where those who had finished their games could benefit from the expert opinion of Grandmaster Helmut Pfleger. TV screens were displayed throughout the venue to cover the positions on the top boards. Peter Leko of Hungary, the world's youngest IM at the time, played in the U-14 event and was expected to win with an enormous Elo rating advantage over his closest rival. However, his opponents had not read the script and he finished a disappointing fourth. There was a shock too in the Girls' U-14 section, when the Romanian Corina Peptan, top seed and national champion at 14, only managed to secure the silver medal. In contrast, the U-18 events went according to expectation with Sakaev (in the Boys/Open) and Kadimova (in the Girls) totally dominant. There was a good showing from the English contingent; by comparison other western European nations failed miserably. McShane won the Boys/Open U-10 event, despite being the youngest competitor at 8. Ruth Sheldon took silver in the U-12 Girls and Harriet Hunt a bronze in the U-14 Girls, even though she was heavily outrated.

 --- CHESS magazine Vol 57. September pp. 20–22

1993 – Bratislava, Slovakia – (17–29 July) – Held at the Park of Culture and Leisure, the Slovakian Federation played host to a record number of participants from a staggering 78 nations. Unfortunately the tournament got off to a bad start, before even a game had been played. The organisers had implemented an arduous registration process, designed to catch late registrants and penalise them or their federation with a $100 U.S. late entry fee. It appeared to be a cynical attempt at earning the organising committee a tidy sum. There were a number of protests; some paid up and others refused. Before things turned too nasty, Florencio Campomanes stepped in and ordered a reduction in the fee, which helped patch things up. However, the French were so upset that they decided to boycott the opening celebrations. Attending the closing ceremony was former World Champion Anatoly Karpov, the guest of honour replacing Campomanes on his departure. The contest contained a few surprises; Malakhov edged out Peter Leko in the Boys U-14 and a similar fate awaited the rapidly improving Vallejo Pons in the Boys U-12.

 --- CHESS magazine Vol 58. October pp. 16–18

1994 – Szeged, Hungary – (August) – Peter Leko finally got his gold medal, this time in the U-16 Boys event. Bearing in mind his past disappointments, it is worth noting that other high-profile players missed gold medals at this event, including 2 future World Champions. In retrospect, this underlines the strength of the event. Among those taking home silver medals, were Alexandra Kosteniuk (U-10 Girls), Étienne Bacrot (U-12 Boys) and Rustam Kasimdzhanov (U-16 Boys). There was an impressive showing from the Ukrainian Girls Squad, taking 3 of the 5 gold medals on offer.

 --- CHESS magazine Vol 59. January p. 48

1998 – Oropesa del Mar, Spain – (October – November) – The Marina d'Or venue played host to over 1000 players from 48 countries. Russia's bright prospect Alexander Grischuk, already an International Master with a near Grandmaster rating, was (at 15 years) participating in the U-18 category. England turned up with a strong looking squad and performed even above their own expectations, landing two gold medals. Russia's Kosintseva sisters did enough to suggest they might become a powerful force in Ladies chess for years to come; Nadezhda took gold in the U-14 and Tatiana took silver in the U-12. The Boys / Open U-14 category comprised an unusually strong list of entrants, with David Navara and Zahar Efimenko taking silver and bronze respectively.

 --- CHESS magazine Vol 63. December pp. 37–40

External links
 Several results, all age categories: 1974–2004
 Several results, all age categories: 1974–2004
 World Cadet Chess Championship: 1974–2007
 Results 1997 edition: U16,U18 
 Results from chess.gr: 1996 , 1998 , 2001 , 2002 , 2003 
 Homepages: 2004, 2007, 2012 2018
 Romanian successes in the championship: 1974–2007 
 2009 official site
 On the 1987 edition: 1987

Youth
Chess championship